Qualification for tennis at the 2016 Summer Olympics in Rio de Janeiro, Brazil was not determined by any form of qualifying tournament, but by the rankings maintained by the Association of Tennis Professionals (ATP) and the Women's Tennis Association (WTA).

Qualifying criteria
The main qualifying criteria were the ATP and WTA ranking lists published on 6 June 2016. The players entering were formally submitted by the International Tennis Federation. The ATP and WTA rankings were based on performances from the previous 52 weeks, and there were several tournaments in the two-month period between the time of the rankings being frozen for entry and the beginning of the tennis events at the Olympics. Players had to be part of a nominated team for three Fed Cup (women) or Davis Cup (men) events between the 2012 and 2016 Olympics. This requirement was reduced to two Fed/Davis Cup events during the Olympic cycle from 2012 to 2016 if their nation competed at the Zone Group round robin level for three of the four years or if the player had represented their nation at least twenty times. All players were required to have been part of a nominated team for a Fed/Davis Cup event in 2015 or 2016, and to have had a good standing with their National Olympic Committee.

Each National Olympic Committee (NOC) could enter 6 male and 6 female athletes, with a maximum of 4 entries in the individual events, and 2 pairs in the doubles events. Any player in the world's top 56 was eligible, and NOC's had the option to enter players of a lower rank. Athletes were able to compete in both singles and doubles events. Doubles players within the top 10 rankings on 6 June were eligible to bring any player provided that player had any doubles or singles ranking, and the number of players of the same country did not surpass the total of six.

Qualified players
This is the final list of qualified players as published by the ITF on 5 August 2016.

Men's singles

 Aljaž Bedene has previously represented Slovenia, making him ineligible for Great Britain. His nominations for Slovenian Davis Cup team are not counted here.

Women's singles

 Years spent exclusively in the Zonal Round robin format during the four-year Olympic cycle

Including the 2012 Fed Cup World Group Final

Men's doubles

 Combined Ranking. The best ranking (singles or doubles) of Player A is added to that of Player B to calculate the Combined Ranking.

 Singles Ranking

 Doubles Ranking

Women's doubles

 Combined Ranking. The best ranking (singles or doubles) of Player A is added to that of Player B to calculate the Combined Ranking.

 Singles Ranking

 Doubles Ranking

Mixed doubles

 Combined Ranking. The best ranking (singles or doubles) of Player A is added to that of Player B to calculate the Combined Ranking.

 Singles Ranking

 Doubles Ranking

References

External links
 Official Davis Cup website
 Official Fed Cup website
 Rio 2016 Olympics official website

Qualification for the 2016 Summer Olympics
Tennis at the 2016 Summer Olympics
Qualification for tennis tournaments